Affinity is a 1962 studio album by the Oscar Peterson Trio.

The album is included in its entirety on the 1996 CD reissue (and many subsequent digital releases) of the 1959 Oscar Peterson Trio album The Jazz Soul of Oscar Peterson.

Track listing 
 "Waltz for Debby" (Bill Evans, Gene Lees) – 5:53
 "Tangerine" (Johnny Mercer, Victor Schertzinger) – 4:41
 "Gravy Waltz" (Steve Allen, Ray Brown) – 4:26
 "This Could Be the Start of Something" (Allen) – 4:43
 "Baubles, Bangles, & Beads" (George Forrest, Robert Wright) – 4;13
 "Six and Four" (Oliver Nelson) – 7:03
 "I'm a Fool to Want You" (Joel Herron, Frank Sinatra, Jack Wolf) – 3:44
 "Yours Is My Heart Alone" (Franz Lehár, Fritz Löhner-Beda) – 5:38

Personnel 
 Oscar Peterson – piano
 Ray Brown – double bass
 Ed Thigpen – drums

References 

1962 albums
Oscar Peterson albums
Verve Records albums
Albums produced by Norman Granz